American Housewife is an American television sitcom that debuted on October 11, 2016, on ABC, starring Katy Mixon, Diedrich Bader, Meg Donnelly, Daniel DiMaggio, Julia Butters (seasons 1–4), Ali Wong, and Carly Hughes (seasons 1–4). Giselle Eisenberg replaces Julia Butters as of season 5. Hughes exited the series after appearing in the season 5 premiere, which was scripted as the season 4 finale. The series is created and written by Sarah Dunn who is co-executive producer with Aaron Kaplan, Kenny Schwartz, Rick Wiener, Ruben Fleischer, and Kapital Entertainment–ABC Studios co-production. On May 10, 2019, ABC renewed the series for a fourth season. In May 2020, the series was renewed for a fifth season, which premiered on October 28, 2020. The series aired its 100th episode on February 24, 2021.

On May 14, 2021, ABC canceled the series after five seasons. The cancellation was somewhat unexpected, as season 5 ended with multiple cliffhangers.

Series overview

Episodes

Season 1 (2016–17)

Season 2 (2017–18)

Season 3 (2018–19)

Season 4 (2019–20)

Season 5 (2020–21)

Ratings

Overview

Season 1

Season 2

 Live +7 ratings were not available, so Live +3 ratings have been used instead.

Season 3

Season 4

Season 5

References

External links
Episode guide at ABC.com

Lists of American sitcom episodes